Pulau Pisang is a small island in Pontian District, Johor, Malaysia.

The island, which is about 12 kilometres from the town of Pontian Kechil and 5 kilometres from Benut town, is the site of the Pulau Pisang Lighthouse, a lighthouse guiding ships into the western entrance of the busy Singapore Strait. Singapore currently operates the lighthouse, and the country has publicly announced recognition that the island is Malaysian territory.

In 2003, Minister for foreign affairs of Singapore, S. Jayakumar, acknowledged that sovereignty of Pulau Pisang is with Malaysia and had never disputed that sovereignty. He also maintained that the management of Pulau Pisang Lighthouse should remain with Singapore.

In 2010, the government of Johor states that Pulau Pisang is part of the Johor sultanate and would be gazetted as such.

See also
 Action of 10 September 1782

References

Islands of Johor
Pontian District